Dragon Ball is a Japanese media franchise created by Akira Toriyama in 1984. Five anime instalments based on the franchise have been produced by Toei Animation: Dragon Ball (1986); Dragon Ball Z (1989); Dragon Ball GT (1996); and Dragon Ball Super (2015); followed by the web series Super Dragon Ball Heroes (2018). Since 1986, twenty one theatrical animated films based on the franchise have been released: four based on the original Dragon Ball anime, fifteen based on Dragon Ball Z and two based on Dragon Ball Super. There are also several television specials that were broadcast on Fuji TV and two short films, which were shown at the 2008 Jump Super Anime Tour and Jump Festa 2012 respectively. A two-part hour-long crossover TV special between Dragon Ball Z, One Piece and Toriko aired on Fuji TV in 2013. Additionally, there is a two-part original video animation created as strategy guides for the 1993 video game Dragon Ball Z Side Story: Plan to Eradicate the Saiyans, which was remade in 2010 and included with the Raging Blast 2 video game.

As with the franchise's anime television series, all twenty films and the first three TV specials were licensed in North America by Funimation. In Europe, AB Groupe licensed the second and third Dragon Ball movies, the first nine Z movies and the first two TV specials.

Dragon Ball is one of the most successful franchises in animation history. The anime series is broadcast in more than 80countries worldwide. In the United States, the anime series has sold more than 30million DVD and Blu-ray units as of 2017.

TV series

Web series
In May 2018, V Jump announced a promotional anime for the game Super Dragon Ball Heroes that adapts the games story arcs.

Films

Television specials
The Dragon Ball franchise has spawned three one-hour long television specials that aired on Fuji TV, the first two based on the "Z" portion of the series and the third based on the "GT" portion. Of these specials, the first and third are original stories created by the anime staff, while the second is based on a special chapter of the manga.

Though the specials aired on TV in Japan, Funimation's North American releases of the episodes are on home video, each one labeled "Feature" the same as their theatrical films. This, doubled with the inclusion of the "Z" specials in Funimation's remastered "Movie Double Features" has caused fans to continue to erroneously believe these to be theatrical films, when they are not.

On April 7, 2013, a two-part hour-long crossover TV special, between Dragon Ball Z, One Piece and Toriko, referred to as Dream 9 Toriko & One Piece & Dragon Ball Z Super Collaboration Special!! aired on Fuji TV. The first part is named  and the second is titled . The plot has the International Gourmet Organization (from Toriko) sponsoring the Tenka'ichi Shokuōkai, a race with no rules that characters from all three series compete in.

On October 8, 2017, a two-part TV special of Dragon Ball Super aired on Fuji TV. It counted as both episodes 109 and 110 of the series.

On December 2, 2018, as part of promoting new film Broly, a one-hour television special aired on Fuji TV in Japan entitled "Just Before the Dragon Ball Super Movie Debut! Looking Back on the TV Show's Climax	".

Festival films
Dragon Ball: Yo! Son Goku and His Friends Return!! is a 35-minute anime short film that was shown at the 2008 Jump Super Anime Tour, which visited ten Japanese cities to celebrate Weekly Shōnen Jumps 40th anniversary. It was later released as a triple feature DVD with One Piece: Romance Dawn Story and Tegami Bachi: Light and Blue Night Fantasy in 2009, that was available only through a mail-in offer exclusive to Japanese residents. In 2013, it was included in the limited edition home video release of Battle of Gods.

Another short film, Dragon Ball: Episode of Bardock, was shown at the Jump Festa 2012 event on December 17, 2011. It is an adaptation of the three part spin-off manga of the same name by Naho Ōishi that ran in V Jump from August to October 2011, which is a spin-off sequel to the Bardock – The Father of Goku TV special. It was later released on DVD in the February 3, 2012 issue of Saikyō Jump together with Dragon Ball: Plan to Eradicate the Super Saiyans. The film was included subtitled in the European and North American exclusive Xbox 360 video game Dragon Ball Z: For Kinect, released in October 2012.

Original video animations
In 1993, Toei Animation, in cooperation with Weekly Shōnen Jump and V Jump, produced a two-part original video animation (OVA) that serves as a video strategy guide to the Family Computer game titled Dragon Ball Z Side Story: Plan to Eradicate the Saiyans. The first volume was released on VHS on July 23, while the second was released on August 25. The animation was also used in the 1994 two part video games, True Plan to Eradicate the Saiyans, released for the Playdia. The complete OVA was included in the second Dragon Ball Z Dragon Box DVD set released in Japan in 2003.

The OVA was remade for the 2010 PlayStation 3 and Xbox 360 video game Dragon Ball: Raging Blast 2 under the title Dragon Ball: Plan to Eradicate the Super Saiyans. It was included in Dragon Ball: Raging Blast 2 as a bonus feature, unlocked at the start of gameplay without any necessary cheat code or in-game achievement, presented in its original Japanese-language audio with subtitles appropriate for each region. It was later released on DVD in the February 3, 2012 issue of Saikyō Jump together with Dragon Ball: Episode of Bardock.

Educational programs
Two educational shorts based on the original Dragon Ball anime were produced in 1988. The first was a traffic safety special titled , while the second was a fire safety special titled . The two educational films were included in the Dragon Box DVD set released in Japan in 2004.

Commercial reception
Dragon Ball is one of the most successful franchises in animation history. The anime series is broadcast in more than 80countries worldwide. DVD home video releases of the Dragon Ball anime series have topped Japan's sales charts on several occasions. In the United States, the Dragon Ball Z anime series sold over 25million DVD units by January 2012. , the Dragon Ball anime franchise has sold more than 30million DVD and Blu-ray units in the United States.

The following table lists Toei Animation's net earnings from Dragon Ball anime home media, including domestic and overseas licensing as well as overseas sales, between 2003 and 2019. It does not include sales or earnings from domestic or overseas licensee companies, such as Fuji TV or Pony Canyon in Japan, or Funimation in North America, for example, but only includes Toei Animation's earnings as an anime licensor and overseas distributor.

Individual series
The following table lists Dragon Ball anime DVD and Blu-ray sales in Japan (excluding home video sales of the anime films) and the United States.

Notes

References

External links

 
Anime